Héric is a commune in the Loire-Atlantique department in western France.

Population

Personalities
One of its most famous citizens is Paul Tessier, father of craniofacial surgery.

See also
Communes of the Loire-Atlantique department

References

Communes of Loire-Atlantique